Silverbird is the debut solo studio album by English singer-songwriter Leo Sayer. It was originally released in November 1973 by Chrysalis (UK), and Warner Bros. (US). It was co-produced by former British pop teen idol Adam Faith and David Courtney.

Sayer began his career as a recording artist under the management guidance of Adam Faith, who signed Sayer to the Chrysalis label in the UK and Warner Bros. Records in the USA. His debut single "Why Is Everybody Going Home" failed to chart, but he shot to national prominence in the UK with his second single, the plaintive music hall-styled song "The Show Must Go On", which Sayer memorably performed on British television wearing a pierrot costume and make-up. The single went quickly to No. 2 on the UK chart, as did this debut album, for which Sayer wrote nine of the eleven tracks; the other two tracks were co-written with Courtney.

Recording
The recording of Silverbird was a difficult and somewhat experimental process, Adam Faith and David Courtney were having loads of ideas but had no real experience in record production. The writers were inspired however and the album started to come together at Virgin Records' Manor Studios in Shipton-on-Cherwell in Oxfordshire. Further recording took place at the Who's lead singer Roger Daltrey's Barn Studio, Burwash, East Sussex, Nova Studios and Olympic Studios, and later at the Beatles' Apple studios. At Daltrey's the recording took further shape with the team creating, amongst others, the unique "The Show Must Go On".

Track listing
All lyrics by Leo Sayer, music by David Courtney.

Side one
"Innocent Bystander" – 3:02
"Goodnight Old Friend" – 2:50
"Drop Back" – 3:29
"Silverbird" – 1:12
"The Show Must Go On" – 3:32
"The Dancer" – 4:30

Side two
"Tomorrow" – 4:12
"Don't Say It's Over" – 3:15
"Slow Motion" – 1:44
"Oh Wot a Life" – 2:53
"Why Is Everybody Going Home" – 4:14

Personnel
 Leo Sayer - guitar, harmonica, vocals
 Russ Ballard - guitar, keyboards
 Max Chetwyn - guitar on "Drop Back"
 David Courtney – piano
 Michael Giles - drums
 Robert Henrit - drums
 Henry Spinetti - drums
 Dave Wintour - bass guitar

Del Newman - string arrangements
Technical
Graham Hughes - sleeve concept, photography

Production
Record producer: David Courtney, Adam Faith
Engineers: John Mills (Apple Studios). Richard Dodd, Keith Harwood, Tom Newman

Charts

References

External links
 

1974 debut albums
Chrysalis Records albums
Leo Sayer albums
Warner Records albums
Albums recorded at Olympic Sound Studios